"Lady" is a song with lyrics by Larry Kusik and Charles Singleton and music by Bert Kaempfert and Herbert Rehbein.

Background
"Lady" was recorded by Jack Jones and released as a single in 1967 on Kapp Records #K-800. (B-side: "Afraid To Love").

Chart performance
In March 1967, "Lady" spent four weeks at number one on the US Easy Listening chart, the final of three number ones on the chart for Jones. On the Billboard Hot 100, "Lady" peaked at number 39 and was  Jones's final Top 40 hit.

Other versions
Other versions have been recorded by:
James Darren
Johnny Mathis

See also
List of number-one adult contemporary singles of 1967 (U.S.)

References

1967 songs
Jack Jones (singer) songs
Songs with lyrics by Larry Kusik
Songs written by Charles Singleton (songwriter)
Songs with music by Bert Kaempfert
Songs with music by Herbert Rehbein